Roger River is a rural locality in the local government area of Circular Head in the North West region of Tasmania.
The 2016 census determined a population of 59 for the state suburb of Roger River.

History
The locality was originally gazetted as Roger River in 1962. In 1978 it was re-gazetted as Rogerton, but five months later it was again re-gazetted as Roger River.

Geography
The Arthur River passes through from south-east to south-west, and then forms part of the south-western boundary. The Duck River passes through from the north-east to the north-west.

Road infrastructure
The C218 route (Trowutta Road) enters from the north-east and travels south for a short distance before splitting to two branches. Trowutta Road exits to the east and Roger River Road runs south-west through the locality before exiting. Route C214 (Blackwater Road) starts at an intersection with route C218 on the south-western boundary and runs away to the south-west.

References

Localities of Circular Head Council
Towns in Tasmania